Kocamustafapaşa station is a closed railway station on the İstanbul-Halkalı Line (B1). The station is located in the Samatya neighborhood of Istanbul's Fatih district. Kocamustafapaşa was closed in 2013 due to the closure of the whole B1 line, after the opening of the new Marmaray line. The tracks are planned to be used in the future to permit the access of international and main line train services to Sirkeci Terminal. But it is unknown if there will be train services that will stop on this station in the future (like all at-grade stations located between Yedikule and Sirkeci Terminal which are bypassed with the opening of Marmaray).

References

Fatih
Railway stations in Istanbul Province
Railway stations opened in 1872
Railway stations closed in 2013
1872 establishments in the Ottoman Empire
Defunct railway stations in Turkey